Tha Blue Herb is a Japanese alternative hip hop trio based in Sapporo, Hokkaido. They formed in 1997 and now consist of three members: Boss the MC a.k.a. Ill-Bosstino (MC), O.N.O. (producer, formerly live DJ until DJ Dye joined Tha Blue Herb in 1999) and DJ Dye (live DJ). They also run a record label called Tha Blue Herb Recordings.

James Hadfield of The Japan Times described Tha Blue Herb as "the Company Flow of Japanese hip-hop."

Beside releasing several albums and singles as the group, O.N.O. also released solo works, while Ill-Bosstino participated in Herbest Moon (with producer Wachall) and Japanese Synchro System (with producer Calm) and also worked with DJ Krush and Audio Active amongst others.

Discography

Albums
 Stilling, Still Dreaming (1998)
 Sell Our Soul (2002)
 Life Story (2007)
 Total (2012)

EPs
 Underground vs. Amateur (2000)
 Front Act (2002)
 The Future Is in Our Hands (2003)
 The Way Hope Goes (2005)
 Phase 3 (2007)

Singles
 "The Shock-Shine Revolt" (1998)
 "The Ring of Wisdom / The Wind Blows from the North" (1998)
 "Underground vs. Amateur" (1999)
 "Times Are Changing" (2000)
 "Trans-Sapporo Express" (2000)
 "Annui Dub: Thank You Very Much My Friend" (2000)
 "3 Days Jump" (2001)
 "Front Act" (2002)
 "The Future Is in Our Hands" (2003)
 "Roads of The Underground" (2004)
 "Chie no Dub / Pusher on the Street" (2005)
 "My Work / My Faith" (2006)
 "Phase 3" (2007)
 "The Suburbs of Hip Hop / A Special Night" (2007)
 "Straight Years" (2009)

Soundtracks
 Heat: Original Soundtrack (2004) a soundtrack album for Heat

DVDs
 Enbu (2007)
 That's the Way Hope Goes (2007)
 Straight Days (2009)

References

External links
 

Japanese hip hop groups
Japanese pop music groups
Musical groups established in 1997
Musical groups from Hokkaido